Stalybridge, Hyde, Mossley & Dukinfield Tramways & Electricity Board (SHMD) was a public transport and electricity supply organisation formed by Act of Parliament in August 1901. It was a joint venture between the borough councils of Stalybridge, Hyde, Mossley and Dukinfield. The system was officially opened on 21 May 1904.

The tramway network
At its inception, the scheme included 21 route miles of tramway and a fleet of forty tramcars. The network was later extended to 27 route miles with a fleet of sixty tramcars. The rails were rolled by Bolckow, Vaughan & Co, Middlesbrough. The points and crossings were made by Hadfield's Steel Foundry Co, Sheffield. The main tram shed was on Park Road, Stalybridge adjacent to the Tame Valley generating station. Smaller tram sheds were also built in Hyde and Mossley.

The rolling stock
The British Westinghouse Co was the lead contractor for the first forty tram cars, supplying much of their electrical and mechanical equipment. The car bodies were sub contracted to the British Electric Car Co, Trafford Park, with bogies from the McGuire Manufacturing Co, Bury and wheel sets from the British Griffin Chilled Iron Co, Barrow in Furness.

Generating and distribution network
The Tame Valley generating station consisted of three Yates and Thom, 815hp, vertical triple expansion steam engines. Each engine driving a Dick, Kerr & Co. 500 kW 60 pole alternator at 80 RPM, giving a three-phase output of 6,000 V at 40 Hz. The station's six Lancashire boilers were supplied by Tinker, Shenton & Co, of Hyde. Most of the electrical switchgear was supplied by Witting, Eborall & Co. Power from the station was distributed at 6,000 V via specially made three-core cables drawn through glazed earthenware underground conduits. Each of the four SHMD towns had its own substation consisting of two synchronous motor generators, each rated at 200k W, converting the 6,000 V three-phase input into an output of 525 V DC to feed the overhead tram wires and 460 V (±230 V) three-wire DC for lighting circuits. The Tame Valley generating station remained in use until 1932, after which the building was used as a workshop and stores. In 1926, the new Hartshead Power Station was opened by the SHMD board.

Later history
In 1936, the organisation's name was changed to the Stalybridge, Hyde, Mossley & Dukinfield Joint Transport & Electricity Board due to most of its tramways being replaced by first trolley buses then motor buses. The last SHMD tram ran in 1945. 
For a number of years after this, the main bus routes were operated by electrically powered “trolley buses” which did not run on rails but on rubber tyres wheels and obtained their power from a pair of overhead cables, each bus having two catenary poles held up against the overhead cables by springs. These catenaries would frequently jump off the rails and the conductor would be obliged to jump off, retrieve a long bamboo pole from a sheath on the side of the trolley bus and use it to replace the contacts on the overhead cables. The SHMD Board owned the trolleybus overhead within its area but did not operate any trolleybuses, which were provided by the neighboroughing undertakings of Ashton-under-Lyne and Manchester Corporation. The board continued to operate motor buses on routes that had never been served by tram. 
In 1948, the SHMD electricity interests were nationalised, with the board's electricity distribution assets being incorporated into Norweb. The Hartshead Power Station became part of the British Electricity Authority, the predecessor of the Central Electricity Generating Board and remained in use until 1979. Norweb continued to use the former Tame Valley generating station building as a maintenance depot until 1984 after which it was sold to Beck & Politzer who continue to use it as a workshop. The Grade II listed Thorn House, the former SHMD head office near to Stalybridge bus station was used for many years by Norweb as an area office and showroom before being sold and converted into flats.

Following the nationalisation of its electricity interests  SHMD continued to operate bus services until 1969 when it was absorbed into SELNEC.
However, its origins in the electrical transport and electricity generation to power the teams and trolleys meant that the affectionate name of “Joint Board” was not lost entirely.
The standard livery of the SHMD fleet was green and cream.

References

External links

 Stalybridge, Hyde, Mossley & Dukinfield Joint Transport and Electricity Board petergould.co.uk

Defunct electric power companies of the United Kingdom
Tram transport in England
History of transport in Greater Manchester
Companies based in Tameside
Railway companies established in 1901
Railway companies disestablished in 1969
Former bus operators in Greater Manchester